Romance, Wisconsin is an unincorporated community in the town of Genoa in Vernon County, Wisconsin, United States.

Religion
RoundRiver Institute is a Buddhist retreat and education center located in Romance near the village of Genoa, Wisconsin.

Notes

External links
Romance, Wisconsin
The RoundRiver Institute

Unincorporated communities in Vernon County, Wisconsin
Unincorporated communities in Wisconsin